Event: Super Combined Women

Date: February 9, 2007

Place:  Åre, Sweden

Downhill Start Time: 12:30 CET

Slalom Start Time: 16:00 CET

Results

External links
FIS-ski.com - 2007 World Championships - Ladies Super Combined

Women's Super Combined